The Real Thing are a British soul group formed in the 1970s. The band charted internationally with their song "You to Me Are Everything", which reached No. 1 on the UK Singles Chart. They also had successes a string of British hits such as "Can't Get By Without You" and "Can You Feel the Force?". They returned to mainstream success in 1986 with the Decade Remix of "You to Me Are Everything". By number of sales, they were the most successful black rock/soul act in England during the 1970s. The journalist, author and founder of Mojo magazine Paul Du Noyer credits them alongside Deaf School with restoring "Liverpool's musical reputation in the 1970s" with their success.

History
Founded in 1970 by Chris Amoo, Dave Smith, Kenny Davis and Ray Lake, the Real Thing's live, progressive soul-influenced covers of American hits attracted enough attention for them to secure a recording deal with EMI. The singles they released through EMI in 1972 and 1973 such as "Vicious Circle" were, despite their high quality, not successful sellers (and have not so far been included on any of the band's compilation albums). But the band persisted, even after the departure of Kenny Davis. They did appear on Opportunity Knocks (the TV talent show). The turn-around for their career began with their collaboration with David Essex and Pye Records. They toured internationally with Essex, recording with him a number of popular songs, though none were big charters. After Chris Amoo's brother Eddie joined the band, the Real Thing finally found chart success with the pop-soul single "You to Me Are Everything", which reached No. 1 on the UK Singles Chart, No. 29 on Billboard's "R&B Singles" and No. 66 on Billboard's "Hot 100". The song was certified silver for 250,000 in sales. Their follow-up, "Can't Get By Without You", did not chart in the US but was still a success in the United Kingdom, where it reached number 2.

In 1976, they released their first album, Real Thing, which included both of their hit singles as well as a third UK hit, "You'll Never Know What You're Missing", which peaked at No. 16. They continued recording prolifically, releasing a steady stream of subsequent albums: 1977's Four from Eight (originally to have been called Liverpool 8 in honour of the racially mixed, economically depressed neighbourhood in which they grew up, before Pye rejected the title), 1978's Step into Our World, (reissued in 1979 as Can You Feel the Force) and 1982's compilation 100 Minutes. During the time period, they accumulated eight more British hits. "Love's Such a Wonderful Thing" peaked at No. 33 in 1977. 1978 saw "Whenever You Want My Love" at No. 18, "Let's Go Disco" at No. 39 and "Rainin' Through My Sunshine" at No. 40. "Can You Feel the Force?" climbed to No. 5 in 1979, the same year that "Boogie Down (Get Funky Now)" hit No. 33. 1980's "She's a Groovy Freak" capped a successful run, at No. 52, coming just a few months too late to be included in the band's first compilation, a K-tel collection of their Greatest Hits released in May 1980. In 1982 they returned to working with David Essex, performing as backing vocalists on his tour and they also performed as backing vocalists on Essex's 1982 top 20 hit "Me and My Girl (Nightclubbing)" appearing with him on Top of the Pops. They scored a dance-floor hit, reaching No. 58 on the UK Disco chart published in Record Mirror and radio playlisted with a single specially written for them by Lynsey De Paul and Terry Britten, called "We Got Love" produced by Nick Martinelli in 1984. The song received positive reviews and was included on a greatest hits of 1984 compilation released by Team Records in Indonesia as well as on the album Black Magic.

In 1986, the band enjoyed a chart resurgence with the remixing of several of their hits. "You to Me Are Everything (The Decade Remix)" by DJ Froggy, Simon Harris and KC charted twice in the UK, peaking at No. 5 during a 12-week run in spring and returning in June for an additional week at No. 72. "Can't Get By Without You (the Second Decade Remix)" rose almost as high to No. 6, remaining for a consecutive 13 weeks. "Can You Feel the Force" ('86 Remix) climbed to No. 24, but the band's final UK charter for the year, "Straight to the Heart", peaked at No. 71, remaining for only two weeks.

In 2002, Daft Punk's Thomas Bangalter teamed up with DJ Falcon to release a single under the name of Together, which sampled the Real Thing's 1977 song "Love's Such a Wonderful Thing". The song was entitled "So Much Love to Give" and became a big club hit (though the single only peaked at No. 71 in the UK charts for Bangalter & Falcon), so much so that a number of other dance records used the same sample over the following years. One of these releases was by N-Trance's Kevin O'Toole and Dale Longworth, who covered "So Much Love to Give" under the name of Freeloaders and released it as a single crediting the Real Thing's vocal contribution unlike the earlier French duo's release. The single, released by AATW in 2005, peaked at No. 9 in the UK charts, giving The Real Thing their sixth Top Ten hit (including remixes) and last hit single.

On 28 January 2022, the duo released their first album in over 40 years.

Everything - The Real Thing Story
In 2019, the band were featured in a documentary called Everything - The Real Thing Story, which charted the history of the band from Eddie's days in Merseybeat doo-wop act the Chants (said to be the only group ever to be backed by the Beatles), through Chris' group's SSB (the Sophisticated Soul Brothers) and Vocal Perfection. The latter act went on to be renamed The Real Thing by manager Tony Hall, after seeing the Coca-Cola advert on a large billboard in Piccadilly Circus. The documentary featured interviews with David Essex, Billy Ocean, Five Star's Denise Pearson, Kim Wilde and Leee John from Imagination; as well as all surviving members of the Chants and the Real Thing. As Eddie Amoo died during the production of the film, the documentary ended up being released two years after his death. Sheridan's lengthy interview with Amoo was shown in full on BBC Four in August 2020.

Group members
 Current
 Chris Amoo (born Christopher Charles Amoo, 14 October 1952, Liverpool) – vocals
 Dave Smith (born David Smith, 6 July 1952) – vocals

 Real Thing Band
 John Chapman – saxophone
 Sam Edwards – keyboards
 Stuart Ansell – guitar
 Jon Bower – bass
 Danny Rose – drums

Former
 Eddie Amoo (born Edward Robert Amoo, 5 May 1944, Liverpool; died 23 February 2018, Melbourne, Australia) – vocals, guitars
 Ray Lake (born Raymond Lake, 11 February 1946, Liverpool; died 2000) – falsetto backing vocals
 Kenny Davis – vocals
 Steve Dixon - drums

Discography

Albums
Studio albums

Live albums

Compilation albums

Singles

See also
List of disco artists (S–Z)
Brit funk
Jazz-funk
List of bands and artists from Merseyside
List of artists who reached number one on the UK Singles Chart
List of performers on Top of the Pops

Further reading
 The Guardian: , The Real Thing: soundtrack to the Toxteth riots

Notes

References

External links
 

English dance music groups
Musical groups established in 1970
English pop music groups
Musical groups from Liverpool
Black British musical groups
Pye Records artists
British rhythm and blues musical groups
British soul musical groups
British disco groups